San Giovanni Bianco is a comune (municipality) in the Province of Bergamo in the Italian region Lombardy, located about  northeast of Milan and about  north of Bergamo, located in the Val Brembana.

References

External links
 Official website